Lavinia Norcross Dickinson (February 28, 1833 – August 31, 1899) was the younger sister of American poet Emily Dickinson.

Lavinia "Vinnie" Dickinson was instrumental in achieving the posthumous publication of her sister's poems after having discovered the forty-odd manuscripts in which Emily had collected her work. Despite promising her sister that she would destroy all correspondence and personal papers, Vinnie sought to have her sister's poetry edited and published by two of Emily's personal correspondents, Thomas Wentworth Higginson and Mabel Loomis Todd. Four years after Emily Dickinson's death, in 1890, Poems was published by Roberts Brothers, Boston. By the end of 1892, it had already been through eleven editions.

Vinnie was the youngest of the Dickinson siblings born to Edward Dickinson and his wife Emily Norcross in Amherst, Massachusetts. She never married and remained at the Dickinson Homestead until her death.

In popular culture
 In Apple TV+'s 2019–2021 series Dickinson, Anna Baryshnikov plays Dickinson in a comedic interpretation.

Notes

References
Sewall, Richard B.. 1974. The Life of Emily Dickinson. New York: Farrar, Straus, and Giroux. .

Further reading
 
 
 

People from Amherst, Massachusetts
Dickinson family
1833 births
1899 deaths
19th-century American poets
19th-century American women writers